The Ensted Power Station (also known as the Aabenraa Power Station) was a thermal power plant in Aabenraa, Denmark. The power station was fueled by coal, straw and woodchips. It is operated by DONG Energy.

The power station had two units, which went in service in 1969 and 1977. Coal is delivered to the power station by ship. The harbour of the power plant is with a depth of  the deepest of Denmark.

It was permanently closed in 2013 and demolished in 2019.

See also 

 List of power stations in Denmark

Energy infrastructure completed in 1969
Energy infrastructure completed in 1977
Coal-fired power stations in Denmark
Biomass power stations in Denmark
Cogeneration power stations in Denmark
Ørsted (company)
Demolished buildings and structures in Denmark
Buildings and structures demolished in 2019